The nightmare flip (also known as a nightmare kickflip hyperflip or nightmare varial flip), is an aerial skateboarding trick.

Description
To perform the nightmare flip aerial trick, the skateboarder kicks their board in order to make it flip 720 degrees along the board's long axis, while turning in a 180 degree motion toward the toe edge of the board, essentially combining a double kickflip, and a pop shove it. This trick is also called a varial double flip.

Inventor
It was most likely invented by Rodney Mullen, an early skateboarder. However, it is also possible that it is simply a variation on one of his tricks, created by someone else.

References

Skateboarding tricks